Yasti Kand (also Romanized as Yāstī Kand; also known as Yāsī Kand) is a village in Ajorluy-ye Sharqi Rural District, Baruq District, Miandoab County, West Azerbaijan Province, Iran. At the 2006 census, its population was 331, in 73 families.

References 

Populated places in Miandoab County